Kalle Mattson (born Kalle Mattson Wainio, September 21, 1990, in Sault Ste. Marie, Ontario) is a Canadian singer-songwriter based in Ottawa, Ontario. He has performed both as a solo artist and as the leader of an eponymous band.

History
Wainio was a high school student at Sir James Dunn Collegiate and Vocational School in Sault Ste. Marie, when he began writing songs under the pseudonym Kalle Mattson to deal with his grief after his mother, Anne Gilmour, who died of cancer when he was 16. In 2008 he released a 6-song EP Telescope, limited to 150 copies, he self-recorded the EP with childhood friend Rory Lewis.

He released his first full-length album Whisper Bee in 2009. It featured Lewis, local musician Frank Deresti and was recorded at the Sir James Dunn Collegiate and Vocational School music studio and was produced by teacher Mark Gough.

By 2011 Kalle Mattson had grown into a full-band featuring Lewis, and fellow Sault-ites Thean Slabbert and Jimmie Chiverelli. The band released the album Anchors in 2011. The video for the song "Thick As Thieves", a "stop motion history of the world" created by animator Kevin Parry, attracted the band's first widespread media attention; as a result, the band signed to the independent record label Parliament of Trees, which reissued Anchors in late 2011.

In 2012, they released the EP Lives in Between. The EP was supported by the single "Water Falls", whose video was again animated by Parry as a portrait of San Francisco.

In 2014 Mattson released the full-length album Someday, the Moon Will Be Gold. The album was produced by Gavin Gardiner from The Wooden Sky and featured Jeremy Fisher, members of Cuff The Duke along with contributions from Lewis, Slabbert, JF Beauchamp and Kyle Woods. The album's cover was a painting by Mattson's mother, and the lyrical themes addressed Mattson coming to terms with the deaths of his mother and grandmother. The album was supported by concert tours in Europe and Canada, and was longlisted for the 2014 Polaris Music Prize. Mattson won Best Songwriter and Best Album by a Solo Artist at the 2015 Northern Ontario Music & Film Awards.

Mattson released the six-song EP Avalanche in August 2015. The EP was produced by Colin Munroe and featured Ottawa musician Jim Bryson. The EP's title track was accompanied by a video, directed by Philip Sportel, which depicts Mattson creatively recreating 35 iconic album covers over the course of 3:45 featuring the likes of Elliott Smith, Jay-Z, Wilco, Radiohead, The Velvet Underground, Bruce Springsteen, Bob Dylan and Beck. The video received a Juno Award nomination for Video of the Year at the Juno Awards of 2016 and a MuchMusic Video Award nomination for Best Director at the 2016 iHeartRadio Much Music Video Awards, and won the 2016 Prism Prize.

Later in 2015, he released a non-album acoustic cover of Drake's single "Hotline Bling".

In 2016, Mattson toured Canada as an opening act for Jason Collett.

He released his newest album, Youth, in 2018. The album was once again produced by Colin Munroe and was mixed by Noah Georgeson.

Mattson has also collaborated with Andrew Sowka in the project Summersets, which released the EP Small Town Saturday in 2020.

Discography

See also

Music of Canada
Canadian rock
List of Canadian musicians
List of bands from Canada

References

External links
 Official website

1990 births
Canadian folk rock musicians
Canadian folk-pop singers
Canadian indie rock musicians
Canadian folk singer-songwriters
Canadian male singer-songwriters
Living people
Musicians from Ottawa
Musicians from Sault Ste. Marie, Ontario
Canadian people of Finnish descent
21st-century Canadian male singers